Francica is a comune (municipality) in the Province of Vibo Valentia in the Italian region Calabria, located about  southwest of Catanzaro and about  south of Vibo Valentia.

Francica borders the following municipalities: Gerocarne, Mileto, San Costantino Calabro, San Gregorio d'Ippona, Stefanaconi, Vibo Valentia.

Demographic evolution

References

Cities and towns in Calabria